The 1989 German motorcycle Grand Prix was the sixth round of the 1989 Grand Prix motorcycle racing season. It took place on the weekend of 26–28 May 1989 at the Hockenheimring circuit.

The weekend was marred by the fatal accident of Italian-born Venezuelan rider Iván Palazzese in the 250cc race, who died after running into the back of Andreas Preining's seized motorcycle. Palazzese was then struck by Bruno Bonhuil and Fabio Barchitta while trying to pick himself up from the ground, causing him to suffer massive chest injuries that would result in his death.

500 cc race report
The front of the grid is Kevin Schwantz, Wayne Rainey and Eddie Lawson, who stay in that order through the first few turns, though Mick Doohan soon takes third spot behind Lawson and Rainey, pushing Schwantz into third.

Lawson seems to miss a shift at a chicane, and lets Rainey and Schwantz through, who have become the leading group of three. The group is tight, and Schwantz still hasn’t broken himself of the habit of looking behind him for no good reason.

Lawson puts himself at the front again, while back down the field Niall Mackenzie crashes out.

Schwantz develops a mechanical problem and drops out, leaving Lawson and Rainey to fight it out for first and Doohan and Christian Sarron for third place.

Last lap: Lawson ahead for the first half, but Rainey gets past on the brakes to a chicane. Going into the stadium section, Rainey is doing everything to keep Lawson behind him, doing a tremendous slide on his Dunlops. Rainey takes a very close win from Lawson, with a big gap to Doohan, then Pierfrancesco Chili and Sarron.

Two DNFs in a row seem to have ended Schwantz' hope for the championship, who was already pessimistic since his crash at Jerez. Schwantz can still affect the outcome of the championship by getting between Lawson and Rainey and denying the latter some points. Rainey and Lawson needle each other after the race and then say nothing to each other for the rest of the season.

500 cc classification

References

German motorcycle Grand Prix
German
German Motorcycle